John Abdy may refer to:
Sir John Abdy (politician) (c. 1714–1759), British baronet and politician
John Thomas Abdy (1822–1899), Regius Professor of Civil Law at Cambridge University
Sir John Abdy, 2nd Baronet (1643–1691) of the Abdy baronets
Sir John Abdy, 1st Baronet (c. 1620–1662) of the Abdy baronets